To Kwa Wan is an underground MTR rapid transit station in Hong Kong on the . It is located beneath Ma Tau Wai Road in central To Kwa Wan, Kowloon City District. The station was built as part of the Sha Tin to Central Link (SCL) project, and opened on 27 June 2021 along with the rest of phase 2 of the Tuen Ma line (–). The station was constructed by a Samsung–Hsin Chong joint venture.

Station layout

The platforms are arranged in a split platform style as the station was constructed under the narrow Ma Tau Wai Road with a high density of nearby buildings. This arrangement also allows trains to switch sides, depending on the terminus. Trains on platform 1 switch to the left side, while trains on platform 2 switch to the right side.

Exits
A: Pau Chung Street 
B: Lok Man Sun Chuen Phase 1
C: Lok Man Sun Chuen Phase 2 and 3 
D1: Ma Tau Wai Road
D2: Chi Kiang Street

Gallery

References

External links
1. To Kwa Wan Station - Official Tuen Ma Line website

MTR stations in Kowloon
Sha Tin to Central Link
Tuen Ma line